The Faculty of Law and Political Science at the University of Tehran,  is one of the oldest institutions of higher education in Iran. It was initially established in College of Political Science in 1899 by the Ministry of Foreign Affairs. The faculty has evolved into the most prestigious law faculty in Iran and has trained most of the country's prominent lawyers, judges, diplomats, and civil servants, many of whom have been very influential in the political and legal life of the country. The alumni include high-profile legal scholars, Political scientists, and International Relations scientists who have engineered the legal, Politics and foreign policy developments of modern Iran. The best and most talented students of law, Political Science and International Relations in Iran choose this school for their studies. Most of the nation's political elite graduated from the school.

History

The School of Political Science was founded in 1899 by Hassan Pirnia. It was run by the Ministry of Foreign Affairs. It later merged with the School of Law (Madreseh-ye āli-e hoquq), which had been established in 1918, to form the Faculty of Law and Political Science of the University of Tehran in 1933.

People

Political
Many of the school's faculty and alumni later became ministers and political figures in Iran. Notable examples are:

Ali-Akbar Dehkhoda, Dean of the School of Political Science, literary figure and founder of the Dehkhoda Encyclopaedia
Mohammad Ali Foroughi, Prime Minister
Mohammad Mosaddegh, Prime Minister
Ali Akbar Siassi, Minister of Education, Minister of Foreign Affairs, Chancellor of Tehran University
Abolqasem Nadjm, Minister, diplomat and astronomer.
Mirza Javad Khan Ameri, Minister, MP
Hassan Rouhani, Former President of Islamic Republic of Iran
Hossein Amir-Abdollahian, Minister and diplomat
Mohammad Mehdi Esmaili,  Minister of Culture and Islamic Guidance
Elham Aminzadeh, Former vice president for legal affairs and former assistant to President in citizenship rights in the administration of President Hassan Rouhani
Laya Joneydi, Former vice president for legal affairs in the administration of President Hassan Rouhani.

See also
 Higher education in Iran
 Academy of Gundishapur
 Nizamiyyah
 List of universities in Iran
 Dar al-Funun
 Tehran University of Medical Sciences, part of Tehran University until 1986.

References

External links
 

University of Tehran
Tehran, University of
Tehran, University of
1934 establishments in Iran
Political science education
Political science in Iran
University of Tehran faculties